The 1988 Embassy World Darts Championship was held at the Lakeside Country Club in Frimley Green, Surrey between 9 and 17 January 1988. The tournament was won by the number 1 seed, Bob Anderson, who played to a high level throughout the week.

Seeds
  Bob Anderson
  John Lowe
  Eric Bristow
  Bob Sinnaeve
  Mike Gregory
  Jocky Wilson
  Cliff Lazarenko
  Dave Whitcombe

Prize money
The prize fund was £85,600.

Champion: £16,000
Runner-Up: £8,000
Semi-Finalists (2): £4,000
Quarter-Finalists (4): £2,200
Last 16 (8): £1,600
Last 32 (16): £1,000

There was also a 9 Dart Checkout prize of £52,000, along with a High Checkout prize of £1,000.

The results

Malcolm Davies of Wales who broke his hand was replaced by Terry O'Dea of Australia in the first round

References

BDO World Darts Championships
Bdo World Darts Championship, 1988
Bdo World Darts Championship
1988 in English sport